Mewati (Devanagri:मेवाती; Perso-Arabic:میواتی) is an Indo-Aryan language spoken by about three million speakers in the Mewat Region (Alwar and Bharatpur, districts of Rajasthan, Nuh district of Haryana).

While other people groups in the region also speak the Mewati language, it is one of the defining characteristics of the Meo culture.

There are 9 vowels, 31 consonants, and two diphthongs. Suprasegmentals are not so prominent as they are in the other dialects of Rajasthani. There are two numbers—singular and plural, two genders—masculine and feminine; and three cases—direct, oblique, and vocative. The nouns decline according to their final segments. Case marking is postpositional. Pronouns are traditional in nature and are inflected for number and case. Gender is not distinguished in pronouns. There are two types of adjectives. There are three tenses: past, present, and future.  Participles function as adjectives.

Phonology
There are twenty plosives at five places of articulation, each being tenuis, aspirated, voiced, and murmured: . Nasals and laterals may also be murmured, and there is a voiceless  and a murmured .

See also
Pinangwan
Maues
Meenas
Jat people
Gujjar

References

Western Indo-Aryan languages
Mewat
Rajasthani languages